This is a list of events that will take place in Europe in 2023.

Incumbents

European Union
President of the European Commission: Ursula von der Leyen
President of the Parliament: Roberta Metsola
President of the European Council: Charles Michel
Presidency of the Council of the EU: 
Sweden (January–June)
Spain (July–December)

Events

January
1 January: Croatia adopted the euro and became the 20th member state of the eurozone. This was the first enlargement of the monetary union since Lithuania's entry in 2015.

Scheduled and predicted events
6 May: Coronation of Charles III and Camilla in Westminster Abbey, London.
13 May: Eurovision Song Contest 2023 in Liverpool, United Kingdom.
18 June: 2023 Turkish general election
 28 October: A partial lunar eclipse will be visible in the evening and the next morning over Europe and most of Africa and Asia and will be the 11th lunar eclipse of Lunar Saros 146.
 On or before 11 November: 2023 Polish parliamentary election for the Parliament of Poland.
 No later than 10 December: 2023 Spanish general election for the Cortes Generales.

See also 

 2023
 2023 in the European Union
 2023 in politics and government
 2020s

References 

 
2020s in Europe
Years of the 21st century in Europe